Ulmetu may refer to several villages in Romania:

 Ulmetu, a village in Vârfuri Commune, Dâmbovița County
 Ulmetu, a village in Copăceni Commune, Vâlcea County